Battleground: Ardennes is a 1995 computer wargame developed and published by TalonSoft. It the first game in the Battleground series

Development
Battleground was the first game released by TalonSoft. It was made on the company's Battleview engine, designed to be reused in subsequent games. Battleground was designed by Jim Rose and John Tiller, the latter of whom was "destined to become one of the most prolific and respected designers in all Grognardia", according to Rock, Paper, Shotgun.

Reception

Battleground: Ardennes was commercially successful. Terry Coleman of Computer Gaming World noted that it was "rare that a new wargame company makes much of a splash in terms of units sold, but TalonSoft is off to a solid start with this title." In 1998, Computer Gaming World dubbed Battleground "the most successful wargame series".

In PC Gamer US, William R. Trotter called Battleground: Ardennes "a most auspicious debut", and noted that he "eagerly await[ed] future releases in the Battleground Series." PC Gamer US later nominated Ardennes for its 1995 "Best Wargame" award, which ultimately went to Steel Panthers.

Legacy
Battleground: Ardennes was the first game in Battleground series. PC Gamer USs William R. Trotter argued in 1996 that Battleground and its sequels had "single-handedly rejuvenated the hex-grid system, combining it with thrilling miniatures-style graphics and beautiful video."

References

External links

1995 video games
Computer wargames
Multiplayer and single-player video games
TalonSoft games
Turn-based strategy video games
Windows games
Windows-only games
World War II video games
Video games about the Battle of the Bulge
Video games developed in the United States